On 14 December 2013, a hand grenade was thrown onto a minibus in Eastleigh, a Somali-dominated suburb in Nairobi, the capital of Kenya. The explosion killed at least 4 people and wounded 36 others. It was the fourth such attack to occur during the 50th anniversary week of Kenya's independence. Thirteen people died since 10 December 2013, with no group claiming responsibility for the assaults. A string of similar attacks have occurred in various areas across Kenya since the Kenyan military deployed troops in southern Somalia against the Al-Shabaab militant group.

See also
Terrorism in Kenya
Westgate shopping mall attack
2011–14 terrorist attacks in Kenya

References

Attacks in Africa in 2013
Mass murder in 2013
2010s in Nairobi
Terrorist incidents in Kenya in 2013
2013 Nairobi bus attack
Terrorist incidents on buses in Africa
2013 murders in Kenya